Tahuamanu District is one of three districts of the province Tahuamanu in Peru.

References